Milenko Veljković (born 20 September 1995) is a Serbian professional basketball player .

Professional career

Taiwan
On September 12, 2022, Veljković signed with the TaiwanBeer HeroBears of the T1 League. On December 13, Veljković was released by the TaiwanBeer HeroBears.

References

External links 
 Profile at aba-liga.com
 Profile at eurobasket.com

Living people
1995 births
ABA League players
Basketball League of Serbia players
KK Mega Basket players
KK Metalac Valjevo players
KK Mladost Zemun players
KK Vršac players
OKK Beograd players
KK Smederevo players
KK Srem players
KK Napredak Aleksinac players
Palencia Baloncesto players
Serbian expatriate basketball people in Bosnia and Herzegovina
Serbian expatriate basketball people in Bulgaria
Serbian expatriate basketball people in Spain
Serbian expatriate basketball people in Taiwan
Serbian men's basketball players
Centers (basketball)
TaiwanBeer HeroBears players
T1 League imports